Events from the year 1757 in art.

Works

 Giovanni Battista Cipriani – Decoration of Lord Mayor of London's State Coach
 Arthur Devis
 Arthur Holdsworth Conversing with Thomas Taylor and Captain Stancombe by the River Dart
 Portrait of Juliana Penn
 Anton Raphael Mengs – The Judgement of Paris (approximate date)
 Giovanni Paolo Panini – Modern Rome (first two versions)
 Joshua Reynolds – Miss Margaret Morris
 Claude Joseph Vernet – Four Times of the Day (series of four paintings)
 John Wollaston – Portraits made in Virginia, including
 Martha Dandridge Custis (illustrated)
 Mann Page and his sister Elizabeth (approximate date)

Births
 January 10 - Joseph Kreutzinger, Austrian portrait painter (died 1829)
 January 23 - Paolo Vincenzo Bonomini, Italian portrait and caricature painter (died 1839)
 March 21 – James Sowerby, naturalist and illustrator (died 1822)
 April 22 – Josef Grassi, Austrian portrait painter (died 1838)
 July 24 – Vladimir Borovikovsky, Ukrainian-born painter especially of Russian portraiture (died 1825)
 August 4 – Guillaume-Joseph Roques, painter (died 1847)
 August 17 – Adam Bartsch, Austrian scholar, artist, and printmaker in engraving and etching (died 1821)
 November 1 – Antonio Canova, sculptor (died 1822)
 November 28 – William Blake, English painter, poet and engraver (died 1827)
 December 2 – Pierre Cartellier, French sculptor (died 1831)
 December 5 – Jean-Pierre Casimir de Marcassus, Baron de Puymaurin, French chemist, medallist, politician, and man of letters (died 1841)
 date unknown
 John Alefounder, English portrait and miniature painter (died 1795)
 Joseph Barber, English landscape painter and art teacher (died 1811)
 Gaetano Stefano Bartolozzi,  Italian engraver, art dealer, and merchant (died 1821)
 Alexandre-Hyacinthe Dunouy, French landscape painter (died 1841)
 Vicente Escobar, Cuban painter (died 1834)
 Abraham Ezekiel Ezekiel, English engraver (died 1806)
 Thomas Hardy, English portrait painter (died c. 1805))
 Nathaniel Plimer, miniaturist (died 1822)
 Mustafa Râkim, Ottoman calligrapher (died 1826)
 Sampson Towgood Roch, Irish painter of miniatures (died 1847)
 William Verstille, American portrait artist (died 1803)

Deaths
 February 26 - Maria Moninckx, Dutch botanical artist and painter (born 1673)
 February 27 – Pier Francesco Guala, Italian painter active in Casale Monferrato (born 1698)
 March 12 – Giuseppe Galli Bibiena (born 1696), Italian designer, second son of Ferdinando Galli Bibiena, most distinguished artist of the Galli-Bibiena family
 April 15
 Rosalba Carriera, Venetian miniaturist (born 1675)
 Franz Joseph Spiegler, German fresco painter (born 1691)
 April 16 – Daniel Gran, Austrian painter of frescoes and altar paintings (born 1694)
 June 26 – Jan Antonín Vocásek, Czech Baroque still-life painter (born 1706)
 August 5 – Antoine Pesne, French-born court painter of Prussia (born 1683)
 August 6 – Ádám Mányoki, Hungarian Baroque painter (born 1673)
 September 3 - Odvardt Helmoldt von Lode, Danish painter and engraver (born 1726)
 September 21 -  Pieter Jan Snyers, Flemish painter (born 1696)
 October 21 (bur.) - Rhoda Delaval, English portrait painter (born 1725)
 date unknown
 Francesco Albotto, Italian painter (born 1721)
 Francesco Ange, Italian painter (born 1675)
 Erik Westzynthius the Elder, Finnish painter (born 1711)
 Antonio Maria Zanetti, Italian artist especially of woodcuts (born 1680)

 
Years of the 18th century in art
1750s in art